Scotoplanetes is a genus of beetles in the family Carabidae, containing the following species:

 Scotoplanetes aquacultor Lakota, Lohaj & Dunay, 2010
 Scotoplanetes arenstorffianus Absolon, 1913

References

Trechinae